Staraya Ivanovka is a rural locality (a village) in Tukayevsky Selsoviet, Aurgazinsky District, Bashkortostan, Russia. The population was 18 as of 2010. There are 3 streets.

Geography 
Staraya Ivanovka is located 30 km north of Tolbazy (the district's administrative centre) by road. Akhmetovo is the nearest rural locality.

References 

Rural localities in Aurgazinsky District